Terebra vanuatuensis is a species of sea snail, a marine gastropod mollusc in the family Terebridae, the auger snails.

Description
The length of the shell attains 37 mm.

Distribution
This marine species occurs off Vanuatu.

References

 Aubry, U. (1999). Nuove terebre e antichi versi. Ancona: L'Informatore Piceno. 47 pp
 Terryn, Y. (2007). Terebridae: A Collectors Guide. Conchbooks & Natural Art. 59 pp + plates

External links
 Fedosov, A. E.; Malcolm, G.; Terryn, Y.; Gorson, J.; Modica, M. V.; Holford, M.; Puillandre, N. (2020). Phylogenetic classification of the family Terebridae (Neogastropoda: Conoidea). Journal of Molluscan Studies. 85(4): 359–388

Terebridae
Gastropods described in 1999